Aaron Lewis Brown, Jr. (November 16, 1943 – November 15, 1997) was an American football defensive lineman born in Port Arthur, Texas. Brown played for the Kansas City Chiefs from 1966 to 1972 and Green Bay Packers from 1973 to 1974. Brown is an alumnus of the University of Minnesota.

Brown was selected by the Kansas City Chiefs with their first round selection in the 1966 American Football League Draft and later that year Brown participated in the first AFL-NFL World Championship game with the team (later known as the Super Bowl).  Three years later, Brown was on the 1969 Chiefs' team that won the final AFL-NFL World Championship.

Due to his speed of 4.7 in the 40 yard dash, Hank Stram, coach of the Chiefs, decided to try Brown at running back. Brown developed callouses on his thighs, which caused him to miss most of a season. Brown's greatest disappointment was failure to be in the starting lineup for Super Bowl I, when Stram decided to start Chuck Hurston at right end instead. In the 1969 AFL Championship, Brown registered 2.5 sacks in the Chiefs 17-7 victory over the Raiders. Brown made up for the missed Super Bowl I opportunity in Super Bowl IV, where he had one sack and tackled Minnesota quarterback Joe Kapp, forcing him to leave the game in the 4th quarter.

He died on November 15, 1997, in Houston, Texas, when struck from behind by a motorist after walking home one day before his 54th birthday.

See also
List of American Football League players

References

External links
NFL.com player page

1943 births
1997 deaths
All-American college football players
American football defensive ends
Green Bay Packers players
Kansas City Chiefs players
Minnesota Golden Gophers football players
Players of American football from Texas
Sportspeople from Port Arthur, Texas
American Football League players
Road incident deaths in Texas